Fadia is a name. It is the feminine form of the names Fadi and Fady as well as the feminine form of the Roman nomen Fadius. Notable persons with that name Fadia include:

Women of the Fadia gens
Fadia, first wife of Roman general Mark Antony
Princess Fadia of Egypt (1943–2002), youngest daughter of the late King Farouk of Egypt 
Fadia Najeeb Thabet, Yemeni child protection officer
Fadia Faqir, Jordanian British author
Fadia Omrani (born 1984), Tunisian handball player
Ankit Fadia (born 1985), Indian author, speaker, television host, and hacker